Nóra Edöcsény-Hóbor (born February 2, 1974, in Budapest) is an athlete from Hungary, who competes in triathlon. Edocseny competed at the first Olympic triathlon at the 2000 Summer Olympics.  She took nineteenth place with a total time of 2:05:20.03.

References
sports-reference

1974 births
Living people
Hungarian female triathletes
Triathletes at the 2000 Summer Olympics
Olympic triathletes of Hungary
Sportspeople from Budapest